Rennie Lake is an all-sports lake  southeast of Traverse City, Michigan, United States.

See also
List of lakes in Michigan

References

Lakes of Michigan
Lakes of Grand Traverse County, Michigan